Where Have You Gone is the twenty-first studio album by American country artist Alan Jackson, released on May 14, 2021, through ACR/EMI.

Content
Where Have You Gone is Jackson's first new studio album since Angels and Alcohol in 2015. Jackson wrote 15 of the songs on the album. It was produced by Keith Stegall, who has produced all but one of his studio albums. Many of the studio musicians are ones who have played on his previous albums, including guitarist J. T. Corenflos, fiddler Stuart Duncan, drummer Eddie Bayers, and steel guitarist Paul Franklin. Three songs were released in advance: "The Older I Get" was a single in 2017 prior to the album's release. Also released were the title track, in which Jackson comments on the contemporary state of the country music genre, and "You'll Always Be My Baby", a song that he wrote with the intention of having listeners play at weddings. Also included on the album is a cover of the Lefty Frizzell-Sanger D. Shafer composition "That's the Way Love Goes", which has been a hit single for both Johnny Rodriguez and Merle Haggard.

Critical reception
Rating it 4 out of 5 stars, Stephen Thomas Erlewine of AllMusic wrote that "Jackson knows himself so well as a singer and songwriter that he doesn't shy from his strengths, he writes songs to showcase his smooth, supple voice and love of old-fashioned country. The simplicity of his goals means Where Have You Gone might seem a bit modest even at its oversized length, but that's also its charm."

Track listing
All songs written by Alan Jackson, except where noted.
"Where Have You Gone" – 4:47
"Wishful Drinkin'" – 3:50
"I Can Be That Something" – 4:40
"Where the Cottonwood Grows" – 3:01
"Way Down in My Whiskey" – 3:56
"Things That Matter" (Keith Stegall, Michael White) – 3:42
"Livin' on Empty" – 4:31
"You'll Always Be My Baby" (Written For Daughters' Weddings) – 3:46
"Where Her Heart Has Always Been" – 3:27 
"The Boot" (Adam Wright) – 3:24
"Back" – 5:13
"Write It in Red" – 4:15
"So Late So Soon" (Scotty Emerick, Daniel Tashian, Sarah Buxton) – 3:46
"This Heart of Mine" (Wright) – 3:18
"A Man Who Never Cries" – 4:55
"Chain" – 3:06
"I Was Tequila" – 5:10
"I Do" (Written For Daughters' Weddings) — 2:51
"Beer:10" – 4:18
"The Older I Get" (Wright, Sarah Turner, Hailey Whitters) – 3:49
"That's the Way Love Goes" (Lefty Frizzell, Sanger D. Shafer) – 3:08

Personnel
Adapted from liner notes.

Roy Agee – trombone, gang vocals (track 20)
Eddie Bayers – drums
Vinnie Ciesielski – trumpet, gang vocals (track 20)
J.T. Corenflos – electric guitar
Stuart Duncan – fiddle, mandolin
Robbie Flint – Dobro
Paul Franklin – steel guitar
Brad Guin – saxophone, gang vocals (track 20) 
Tania Hancheroff – background vocals, gang vocals (track 20)
Travis Humbert – gang vocals (track 20)
John Kelton – bass guitar, gang vocals (track 20)
Brent Mason – acoustic guitar, electric guitar, gut string guitar
Rob McNelley – electric guitar
Alecia Nugent – background vocals
Dave Pomeroy – bass guitar
Gary Prim – Hammond B-3 organ, keyboards, piano, Wurlitzer electric piano
John Wesley Ryles – background vocals, gang vocals (track 20)
Scotty Sanders – Dobro, steel guitar
Sammy Shelor – banjo
Keith Stegall – gut string guitar, Hammond B-3 organ, hand drums, piano, gang vocals (track 20)
Bruce Watkins – acoustic guitar
Glenn Worf – bass guitar

Charts

Weekly charts

Year-end charts

References 

2021 albums
Alan Jackson albums
EMI Records albums
Albums produced by Keith Stegall